Stephanite is a silver antimony sulfosalt mineral with formula: Ag5SbS4. It is composed of 68.8% silver, and sometimes is of importance as an ore of this metal.

History
Under the name Schwarzerz it was mentioned by Georgius Agricola in 1546, and it has been variously known as "black silver ore" (German Schwarzgultigerz), brittle silver-ore (Sprödglanzerz), etc. The name stephanite was proposed by W Haidinger in 1845 in honour of the Archduke of Austria Stephan Franz Victor of Habsburg-Lorena (1817-1867). French authors use F. S. Beudant's name psaturose (from the Greek ψαθυρός, fragile).

Properties
It frequently occurs as well-formed crystals, which are orthorhombic and occasionally show indications of hemimorphism: they have the form of six-sided prisms or flat tables terminated by large basal planes and often modified at the edges by numerous pyramid-planes. Twinning on the prism-planes is of frequent occurrence, giving rise to pseudo-hexagonal groups like those of aragonite. The colour is iron-black, and the lustre metallic and brilliant; on exposure to light, however, the crystals soon become dull. Stephanite is an important ore of silver in some mining camps.

Occurrence
Stephanite occurs as a  late-stage mineral with other ores of silver in hydrothermal veins. Associated minerals include proustite, acanthite, native silver, tetrahedrite, galena, sphalerite and pyrite. Localities which have yielded good crystallized specimens are Freiberg and Gersdorf near Rosswein in Saxony, Chañarcillo in Chile, and exceptionally Cornwall. In the Comstock lode in Nevada massive stephanite and argentite are important ores of silver.

See also
 List of minerals
 List of minerals named after people

References

Attribution

Silver minerals
Antimony minerals
Sulfosalt minerals
Orthorhombic minerals
Minerals in space group 36